The following is a list of notable events and releases of the year 1928 in Norwegian music.

Events

Deaths

 June
 17 – Torgrim Castberg, violinist (born 1874).

Births

 April
 14 – Egil Monn-Iversen, composer.

 August
 10 – Per Asplin, pianist, singer, composer and actor (died 1996).

 November
 25 – Alf Andersen, flautist (died 1962).

 Unknown date
 Per Gunnar Jensen, pop singer, composer, and humanitarian firefighter (died 2014)

See also
 1928 in Norway
 Music of Norway

References

 
Norwegian music
Norwegian
Music
1920s in Norwegian music